Escobaria robbinsorum (syn. Coryphantha robbinsorum) is a rare species of cactus known by the common names Cochise pincushion cactus and Cochise foxtail cactus. It is native to southern Arizona in the United States, where it is known only from Cochise County, and northern Sonora in Mexico. There are scattered small occurrences on the north side of the border, and one known population to the south. Because of its rarity and a number of threats to remaining plants, the species was federally listed with a threatened status in 1986.

This cactus lives mostly buried in the ground with only its top few centimeters exposed. There is a cluster of spines on each areole, surrounded by a tuft of white woolly hairs. The spines are straight and white, often with dark tips, and measure 1 or 2 centimeters long. The flower is 1 to 3 centimeters long and has greenish yellow tepals. The fruit is bright red to orange, succulent, and under a centimeter in length. The plant grows in nearly solid bedrock with little soil or sand, in full sunlight. It can be found in dense colonies of up to 1000 individuals.

Threats to this plant include a prolonged drought in the region which is thought to have caused mortality. Drought conditions can also make the living cacti harder to find because they shrink and retract into the ground. Illegal activity at the Mexico – United States border is thought to impact the plant. Drug smuggling and illegal immigration activity damage the habitat in the area by increasing trampling, vehicle damage, and possibly incidence of fire. Trampling may also occur when well-meaning volunteers and researchers comb the area for specimens. The plant is probably a target for harvesting by cactus enthusiasts and dealers, but the populations in Arizona are relatively well-protected from this activity. Oil exploration and grazing affect the area. Invasive plant species, especially buffelgrass (Pennisetum ciliare), are becoming more abundant in this desert region and compete with native flora. Insects apparently damage the cacti, but to what extent is not known. This species is not particularly efficient in reproduction; each plant makes about 20 seeds per year and recruitment is slow.

Little is known about the life history of the cactus; research is still needed on its requirements for climate and substrate, its relationship with predators and pollinators, its abundance, population dynamics, and demographics.

References

External links
USDA Plants Profile

robbinsorum
Flora of Arizona
Flora of Sonora